Apis mellifera ligustica is the Italian bee which is a subspecies of the western honey bee (Apis mellifera).

Origin
The Italian honey bee is endemic to the continental part of Italy, south of the Alps, and north of Sicily, where it survived the last ice age. On Sicily the subspecies is Apis mellifera siciliana.
It is likely the most commercially distributed of all honey bees, and has proven adaptable to most climates from subtropical to cool temperate, but it is less successful in humid tropical regions. Italian bees that originate from the Ligurian alps in northern Italy are often referred to as the Ligurian bee, which is claimed only survives on Kangaroo Island.

Italian bees, having been conditioned to the warmer climate of the central Mediterranean, are less able to cope with the "hard" winters and cool, wet springs of more northern latitudes. They do not form such tight winter clusters. More food has to be consumed to compensate for the greater heat loss from the loose cluster. The tendency to raise broods late in autumn also increases food consumption. Noted beekeeper Thomas White Woodbury first introduced the Italian bee to Britain in 1859, and regarded it as vastly superior to the Old British Black bee (A. m. mellifera).

Anatomy
 Color: Abdomen has brown and yellow bands. Among different strains of Italian bees, there are three different colors: Leather; bright yellow (golden); and very pale yellow (Cordovan).
 Size: Their bodies are smaller and their overhairs are shorter than those of the darker honeybee races.
 Tongue length: 6.3 to 6.6 mm
 Mean cubital index: 2.2 to 2.5

Characteristics

Brother Adam, a bee breeder and developer of the Buckfast bee, characterized the Italian bee in his book Breeding the Honeybee:

While the Italian bee has many strong points, among the A.m. ligustica it has a large number of weak points:

Strengths
shows strong disposition to breeding and very prolific
cleanliness/excellent housekeeper (which some scientists think might be a factor in disease resistance)
uses little propolis
excellent foragers
superb comb builder (writing in Switzerland in 1862, H. C. Hermann stated the comb of an Italian bee-cell occupied only 15 cells for every 16 of the common black bee, and the cubic content was larger by 30%)
covers the honey with brilliant white cappings
shows lower swarming tendency than other Western honey bee races
for areas with continuous nectar flow and favorable weather throughout the summer
industry
gentleness
a willingness to enter supers
tendency to collect flower honey rather than honey dew (of value only in countries where the colour of the honey determines the price)

Weaknesses
lacks vitality
inclined to excessive brood rearing
susceptibility to disease
high consumption of stores
more prone to drifting and robbing than the other principal races of Europe.
the strong brood rearing disposition often results in large food consumption in late winter or early spring that causes spring dwindling and hence slow or tardy spring development
brood rearing starts late and lasts long into late summer or autumn, irrespective of nectar flow
tends to forage over shorter distances than either carnica or mellifera, and may therefore be less effective in poorer nectar flows
for cool maritime regions
for areas with strong spring flow
for areas with periods of dearth of nectar in the summer

Foraging behavior

A. m. ligustica are more concerned with nectar processing behaviors, honey storage, and adult maintenance over brood expansion when compared to the African honey bee, A. m. scutellata.

Selective breeding
Breeders of Italian bees, as well as other honey bee subspecies, look for certain beneficial characteristics. Depending on the breeding goal, one or more of the following characteristics may be emphasized:

Gentleness or excitability
Resistance to various diseases including tracheal mite and Varroa mite
Early spring buildup in population
Wintering ability
Tendency to limited swarming
Ability to ripen honey rapidly
Honeycomb cappings are white
Minimal use of propolis
Availability and queen cost
Color
Source:  George Imrie's pink pages

Worldwide distribution
1853 introduced to Germany
1854 introduced into the Poland by Dr. Jan Dzierżon
1859 introduced into the United Kingdom
1859 introduced to the United States
1862 introduced to Australia, on 9 December into Victoria aboard the steam ship Alhambra There is strong evidence that the subsequent Italian virgin queens hybridised with the English 'black' bee previously imported (source: Barrett, P. "The Immigrant Bees, 1788 to 1898", Vol. IV). Wilhelm Abram brought several queens from Italy to Sydney in December 1880 but it's probable they reached New South Wales through other hands earlier on.
1866 introduced to Russian Empire
1880 introduced to New Zealand
1884 (Easter) introduced to Kangaroo Island in South Australia, sourced from Brisbane where they were previously imported in 1880 from Italy by Chas. Fullwood. Jas. Carroll received a hive of Italian bees in Brisbane, Queensland, in 1877 when Angus Mackay accompanied a hive aboard the City of New York, packaged by Harbison in California. After a week's stopover in Sydney, the bees arrived in Brisbane. Honey from Kangaroo Island is marketed (in 2014) as being from the only pure Ligurian bees in the world.

References

External links

 The Ligurian or Italian Alp-Bee The Sydney Morning Herald 30 Oct 1862
 Bee Culture The Sydney Morning Herald 14 Aug 1914
 bch.umontreal.ca  list of organisms with sequenced genome [Retrieved 2011-12-22]

Fauna of Italy
Western honey bee breeds
Subspecies